The term strict refers to relational operators in mathematics.

Strict may also refer to:

 Strict, a function classification in programming languages - see Strict function
 the strict pragma in the programming language Perl used to restrict unsafe constructs

See also
 List of people known as the Strict
 Strict histories (or executions) in scheduling